The 2022 Arizona Senate election will be held on November 5, 2024. Voters will elect members of the Arizona Senate in all 30 of the state's legislative districts to serve a two-year term. Primary elections are scheduled for August 6, 2024.

Prior to the elections, the Republican Party held a narrow majority over the Democratic Party, controlling 16 seats to their 14 seats.

Overview

Retiring incumbents

Republicans 
 District 30: Sonny Borrelli is term-limited.

Democrats 
 District 8: Juan Mendez is term-limited.

References 

Arizona Senate elections
Senate
Arizona Senate